John Wallace Leavenworth (July 20, 1881 – August 8, 1962) was an American football player and coach. He served as the head football coach at the University of Alabama in 1905, compiling a record of 6–4. Leavenworth played college football as a halfback at Yale University.  He died on August 8, 1962, at Meriden Hospital in Meriden, Connecticut.

Head coaching record

References

External links
 

1881 births
1962 deaths
American football halfbacks
Alabama Crimson Tide football coaches
Yale Bulldogs football players
People from Wallingford, Connecticut